Məlhəm (also, Mel’gam and Mel’kham) is a village and municipality in the Shamakhi Rayon of Azerbaijan.  It has a population of 1,378.

References

Notable residents 
Khaqani

Populated places in Shamakhi District